The New Englander is a cocktail made from two to three parts Moxie to one part gin. The name derives from Moxie's regional popularity in parts of New England. Some people also detect a slight resemblance in taste to Necco wafers, another regional product.

Recipe
1 part Gordon's Gin 
2-3 parts Moxie
a large slice of lime
a dash of Worcestershire sauce

The Worcestershire sauce cuts the drink's sweetness. While some prefer to leave it out, purists argue that a New Englander is incomplete without it.  However, in Western Massachusetts, it is frequently left out - this version is called a "Felix".

References

Cocktails with gin
New England cuisine